Empress Xiaohuizhang (5 November 1641 – 7 January 1718), of the Khorchin Mongol Borjigit clan, was the wife and second empress consort of Fulin, the Shunzhi Emperor. She was empress consort of Qing from 1654 until her husband's death in 1661, after which she was honoured as Empress Dowager Renxian during the reign of her step-son, Xuanye, the Kangxi Emperor. She was posthumously honoured with the title Empress Xiaohuizhang.

Life

Family background
 Father: Chuo'erji (d. 1670), held the title of a third rank prince
 Paternal grandfather: Chahan, held the title of a third rank prince
 Paternal great aunt: Primary consort Minhui (1609–1641)
 Paternal great aunt: Empress Xiaozhuangwen (1613–1688), the mother of the Shunzhi Emperor (1638–1661)
 Mother: Lady Aisin Gioro
 Maternal grandfather: Abatai (1589–1646)
 Seven brothers
 Two elder sisters and two younger sisters
 Fourth younger sister: Consort Shuhui (1642–1713)

Chongde era
Lady Borjigit was born on the third day of the tenth lunar month in the 16th year of the reign of Hong Taiji, which translates to 5 November 1641 in the Gregorian calendar.

Shunzhi era
On 25 October 1653, the Shunzhi Emperor deposed his first empress consort, Erdeni Bumba, who was also from the Borjigit clan. In June or July 1654, Alatan Qiqige entered the Forbidden City and became a concubine of the Shunzhi Emperor. In July or August 1654, she was officially designated as the empress to replace the deposed Erdeni Bumba.

However, the Shunzhi Emperor showed little interest in his new empress consort because he favoured Consort Donggo more than any other consort of his. Some historians believe that the Shunzhi Emperor made Alatan Qiqige his new empress consort because he wanted to reduce tensions between the Aisin Gioro and Borjigit clans after demoting his first empress consort. The Aisin Gioro and Borjigit clans had a long history of political marriages, so the emperor had to choose a Borjigit woman to be his empress consort in order to keep up with tradition.

Kangxi era
The Shunzhi Emperor died on 5 February 1661 and was succeeded by his third son, Xuanye, who was born to Lady Tunggiya. Xuanye was enthroned as the Kangxi Emperor, while Alatan Qiqige, as the empress consort of the previous emperor, was granted the title "Empress Dowager Renxian". She died on 7 January 1718 and was interred in a separate tomb in the Xiao Mausoleum of the Eastern Qing tombs.

Titles
 During the reign of Hong Taiji (r. 1626–1643):
 Lady Borjigit (from 5 November 1641)
 During the reign of the Shunzhi Emperor (r. 1643–1661):
 Empress (from July/August 1654)
 During the reign of the Kangxi Emperor (r. 1661–1722):
 Empress Dowager Renxian (from 5 February 1661)
 Empress Xiaohuizhang (from 1718)

In fiction and popular culture
 Portrayed by Wang Ge in Xiaozhuang Mishi (2003)
 Portrayed by Yang Mingna in Chronicle of Life (2016)

See also
 Ranks of imperial consorts in China#Qing
 Royal and noble ranks of the Qing dynasty

Notes

References
 
 

1641 births
1718 deaths
Qing dynasty empresses
Qing dynasty empresses dowager
Manchu nobility
Borjigin
17th-century Chinese women
17th-century Chinese people
18th-century Chinese women
18th-century Chinese people
17th-century Mongolian women
18th-century Mongolian women